Danny A. Abeckaser is an Israeli-born American actor and filmmaker.

Early life
Abeckaser was born in Israel, the sixth of seven children of Moroccan Jewish parents who immigrated to the U.S. in 1980.  He grew up in Brooklyn.

Career
Abeckaser produced and acted in the film Holy Rollers (2010), which also stars Jesse Eisenberg.

He then played the part of Dino Lapron opposite Michael Shannon and Winona Ryder in the Ariel Vromen film The Iceman (2012) and had a very small role in the Martin Scorsese film The Wolf of Wall Street (2013).

Abeckaser had his first starring role in A Stand Up Guy (2016).

He made his directorial debut with First We Take Brooklyn (2018), which he co-starred with Harvey Keitel.

Abeckaser shared a scene with Robert De Niro as Louie the Deadbeat in the Scorsese film The Irishman (2019).

Personal life
Abeckaser married Instagram model May Almakaies in May 2022.

Filmography

References

External links
 

Living people
21st-century American male actors
American male film actors
Male actors from New York City
People from Brooklyn
American people of Moroccan-Jewish descent
Israeli emigrants to the United States
Year of birth missing (living people)